Rainy Day Friends is a 1986 American independent drama film written and directed by Gary Kent and starring Esai Morales, Chuck Bail and John Phillip Law.

Premise 
A Mexican-American teenager who is suffering from cancer must learn to cope with the patients and staff at the hospital as he undergoes his treatment.

Cast 
Esai Morales as Neekos Valdez
Chuck Bail as Jack Marti
Janice Rule as Dr. Elaine Hammond
Carrie Snodgress as Margot Fisher
Lelia Goldoni as Barbara Marti
John Phillip Law as Stephen Kendricks
Tomi Barrett as Shirley Felton
Anne Betancourt as Josephina Valdez

Reception 
Kevin Thomas of the Los Angeles Times gave the film a mixed review, describing it "as well-meaning as it is miscalculated."

Vincent Canby of The New York Times gave the film a negative review, writing that it "is so stuffed with positive thinking that it seems grossly overweight, though dramatically frail. There's not a spontaneous moment in the movie."

References

External links 
 

1980s English-language films